"Les collines (never leave you)" (English: "The Hills (Never Leave You)") is the 12th single by the French singer Alizée, which was released in 2010. It was the first single from the Une enfant du siècle album. The single is electro-pop. It was composed by Angy Laperdrix, Guillaume de Maria, Julien Galinier and Raphael Vialla.

The single was praised by critics telling it to be "The song and the album that gave new life to Alizée's career, a good buzz in radical change of style."

References

2010 singles
Alizée songs
2010 songs